Mastuj is a town and Tehsil of Upper Chitral District in Khyber-Pakhtunkhwa province of Pakistan. It is located at 36°17'0N 72°31'0E with an altitude of 2359 metres (7742 feet). There are ruins of old fort built originally in 18th century and reconstructed several times.

Geography

Adjacent administrative units
Wakhan District, Badakhshan Province, Afghanistan (north)
Ishkoman Tehsil, Ghizer District, Gilgit-Baltistan (northeast)
Yasin Tehsil, Ghizer District, Gilgit-Baltistan (east)
Gupis Tehsil, Ghizer District, Gilgit-Baltistan (southeast)
Behrain Tehsil, Swat District (southeast)
Sharingal Tehsil, Upper Dir District (southwest)
Chitral Tehsil (southwest)

Villages
The main villages include Buni, Mastuj, Khouzh, Kargin, Marthing, Chuinj, Parkusap, Reshun, Parwak, Kuragh, Aveer, Chapali and Brep.

Tehsil Mastuj starts right after the end of Baranis, Reshun, Kuragh, Buni, Aveer, Parwak, Mastuj, Chinar, Chuinj, Chapali, Kargin, Khuzh and Brep are the main beautiful areas of Tehsil Mastuj.

See also
Asadabad
Kunar Province

References

Populated places in Chitral District
Tehsils of Chitral District
Tehsils of Khyber Pakhtunkhwa
Hill stations in Pakistan
Populated places along the Silk Road
Chitral District